The following lists events during 2023 in the Republic of the Sudan.

Date unknown 

 2023 Sudanese general election will occur as part of its transition to democracy, with a constitutional convention on the electoral system and form of government also scheduled.

References

2023 in Sudan
2020s in Sudan
Sudan
Sudan
Years of the 21st century in Sudan